Hugo Maximilian Philippus Ludwig Franziskus Graf von und zu Lerchenfeld auf Köfering und Schönberg (21 August 1871 in Köfering – 13 April 1944 in Munich), known as Graf von Lerchenfeld-Köfering and as Lerchenfeld for short, was a Bavarian conservative politician and the Prime Minister of Bavaria from 1921 to 1922. He belonged to the Bavarian People's Party, a conservative, strongly federalist party in Bavaria, formed after the First World War.

Biography
Hugo Graf von und zu Lerchenfeld was born 1871 in Köfering as the son of Ludwig Graf von und zu Lerchenfeld and Clara Grafin von Bray-Steinburg. He was married to Ethel Wyman, of New York.

He originally studied law, graduating in 1893. He was employed as a Bavarian government official from 1897 to 1914, later changing to the Imperial government, working as a civil administrator from 1915 to 1918 in the formerly Russian part of Poland, after this in the German foreign department. After the first world war, he became the federal representative of the German government in the state of Hessen.

Hugo Lerchenfeld was appointed as  Bavarian prime minister on 21 September 1921, succeeding Gustav Ritter von Kahr who had resigned earlier. He was chosen by a coalition of conservative parties. He was not a high ranking party official at this stage but rather a respected civil administrator, with a good relationship to the SPD too. He managed during his time in office to largely defuse the crisis caused through Bavarian attempts to break free of the German republic and the federal governments attempts to gain more control over state politics. He also additionally held the post of Minister of Justice.

He faced a coalition crisis in July 1922 due to renewed disputes with the federal government, losing much of his support in his own party but managed to solve the crisis once more. Eventually, for this reason, he had to resign from office on 2 November 1922, being accused of not having achieved enough for Bavaria in the negotiations.

Lerchenfeld continued to serve as a civil servant in the German administration after this, as German ambassador to Austria from 1926 to 1931 and then being involved in legal negotiations with Belgium in 1931.

Graf, as in the name of Hugo Graf von und zu Lerchenfeld, is not a name but a noble title, known in English as count.

See also
 List of Premiers of Bavaria

References

Sources
 Historisches Lexikon Bayerns (in German)
 Universitätsbibliothek Regensburg - Bosls bayrische Biographie - Hugo Graf von und zu Lerchenfeld (in German), author: Karl Bosl, publisher: Pustet, page 476

1871 births
1944 deaths
People from Regensburg (district)
Ministers-President of Bavaria
People from the Kingdom of Bavaria
Ambassadors of Germany to Austria
Counts of Germany
Lerchenfeld auf Kofering und Schonberg, Graf von und zu
Bavarian People's Party politicians
Members of the Reichstag of the Weimar Republic